Toripolliisi (The Bobby at the Market Place in English) is a bronze sculpture located at the market square in Oulu, Finland. It was made by sculptor Kaarlo Mikkonen in 1987. The sculpture measures 220×150×112 centimetres (86.6×59×44 inches), and it was named in honour of the bobbies that once patrolled the market place. The sculpture was funded with the help of a public fund raising started in 1985, and it was revealed in September 1987.

References 

Statues and sculptures in Oulu
Tourist attractions in Oulu
1987 sculptures
Pokkinen
Bronze sculptures in Finland
Sculptures of men
Outdoor sculptures in Finland